Lapeer is a ghost town in Douglas County, Kansas, United States.

History
Lapeer was founded in 1855 on the Santa Fe Trail route. The community was named after Lapeer, Michigan. The Lapeer post office closed in 1902.

References

Further reading

Geography of Douglas County, Kansas
Ghost towns in Kansas